The Henry W. and Ida Frost Dorman House is a 2-story, Neoclassical house in Caldwell, Idaho, designed and constructed in 1910 by local builder Lem Harding. The Dormans occupied the house from 1910 until 1919, when it was purchased by three doctors and refitted as a private hospital, the Caldwell Sanitarium. When the sanitarium closed in 1949, the house was donated to the P.E.O. Sisterhood for renovation as a "chapter house" or retirement home for members.

Henry and Ida Dorman
The Dormans were active in Caldwell civic and social life. Idaho (Ida) Dorman was born in Idaho Territory in 1871 to pioneers Elijah and Matilda Frost. Henry Dorman was born in Illinois in 1865 and arrived in Idaho in 1883. His interests included mining, farming, and ranching. The Dorman Addition and Dorman Avenue in Caldwell are named for Henry Dorman. The Dormans were married in 1893.

References

External links
 
 Dorman PEO House, Idaho Heritage Trust
 Hawley, James H.,Henry W. Dorman, History of Idaho: The Gem of the Mountains (S.J. Clarke, 1920), pp 913

		
National Register of Historic Places in Canyon County, Idaho
Neoclassical architecture in Idaho
Houses completed in 1910
Caldwell, Idaho